Shelbie Carole Bruce (born November 12, 1992) is an American former actress who had a lead role in the 2004 film Spanglish.

Early life 
Shelbie was born in Brownsville, Texas, was homeschooled, and trained as a child model, but later moved to California, where she pursued her film career. Shelbie is part Spanish and Mexican on her mother's side, and part Scottish and Native American on her father's side. She considers herself to be Latina. She explains that the two most important things in her life are her family and Jesus Christ. She speaks fluently in both English and Spanish.

Career 
Shelbie has guest-starred on Nickelodeon shows like Ned's Declassified School Survival Guide and Romeo!. She has also guest-starred on the medical drama ER. She got her big break when she starred in the 2004 film Spanglish in which she played the bilingual daughter of a housemaid who speaks only Spanish. Shelbie signed a deal with Claire's Boutique to have her own jewelry line, which launched on September 8, 2006. She was also a blogger for Mis Quince Magazine, which is an online publication about planning quinceañeras.

Filmography

References

External links 

 
 

1992 births
Actresses from Texas
American child actresses
American film actresses
American television actresses
American people of Scottish descent
American people of Spanish descent
American actresses of Mexican descent
Hispanic and Latino American actresses
Living people
People from Brownsville, Texas
21st-century American actresses